The following have served as presidents of Utah State University. USU is located in Logan, Utah, and was founded in 1888 as the Agricultural College of Utah. This list does not contain names of alumni or faculty of the university, unless such persons have also served as president.

 Jeremiah W. Sanborn (1890–1894)
 Joshua H. Paul (1894–1896)
 Joseph M. Tanner (1896–1900)
 William J. Kerr (1900–1907)
 John A. Widtsoe (1907–1916)
 Elmer George Peterson (1916–1945)
 Franklin S. Harris (1945–1950)
 Louis Linden Madsen (1950–1953)
 Henry Aldous Dixon (1953–1954)
 Daryl Chase (1954–1968)
 Glen L. Taggart (1968–1979)
 Stanford Cazier (1979–1992)
 George H. Emert (1992–2000)
 Kermit L. Hall (2001–2005)
 Stan L. Albrecht (2005–2017)
 Noelle E. Cockett (2017–present)

External links
Presidents of USU each left their mark
Utah State University President's Office

 
Utah State
Utah State University presidents